was a private junior college in Hiyoshi, Kyoto or Nantan at present, Japan. It was established in 2002, and abolished in 2008.

See also 
 Meiji University of Integrative Medicine

External links
  

Japanese junior colleges
Universities and colleges in Kyoto Prefecture